The Leopold Mozart Centre (German:  (LMZ) in Augsburg, Germany, is a university of music, founded as part of the University of Augsburg in 2008. It is located in the buildings of the former Musikhochschule as well as buildings on the university campus.

The Leopold Mozart Centre was founded after the model of the Hochschule für Musik Mainz as part of the University of Mainz.  It is focused on the interchange of music and science, offering music pedagogy, music therapy, mental training and improvisation, among others. The centre offers the common artistic and pedagogical bachelor and master courses such as string instruments, keyboard instruments, voice, wind instruments, percussion, conducting and musicology. All studies include elementary courses in psychology, sociology and political studies. The Collegium Musicum offers possibilities of music making in groups such as the orchestra, choir, chamber choir, big band, and various chamber music ensembles.

Alumni 
Alumni include those of the former Musikhochschule.
 Benjamin Appl (born 1982), German-British lyric baritone 
 Measha Brueggergosman (born 1977), opera singer and moderator
 Markus Brutscher (born 1966), operatic tenor
 Werner Egk (1901–1983), composer
 Julia Fischer (born 1983), violinist
 Robert Görl (born 1955), percussion, band DAF
 Eugen Jochum (1902–1987), conductor
 Georg Ludwig Jochum (1909–1970), conductor
 Iva Mihanovic (born 1978), opera singer
 Magda Schneider (1909–1996), actress, mother of Romy Schneider
 Irmgard Seefried (1919–1988), operatic soprano

Faculty 
Faculty members include those of the former conservatory and Musikhochschule.
 Julius Berger (born 1954), chamber music and cello
 Frieder Bernius (born 1947), voice and oratorio
 Lorenzo Ghielmi (born 1959), organ literature and organ playing
 Franz Kelch (1915–2013), voice
 Emmy Lisken (born 1923), voice
 Heinrich Kaspar Schmid (1874–1953), director of the conservatory
 Rudi Spring (born 1962), correpetition and Lied
 Edith Wiens (born 1950), voice

External links 
 
 

Educational institutions established in 2008
Augsburg
2008 establishments in Germany